The 161 Squadron of the Israeli Air Force, also known as the Black Snake Squadron, operates Elbit Hermes 450 UAVs. It is based at Palmachim airbase.

It was previously an MD 500 Defender and then an AH-1E/F Cobra helicopter squadron under the name Southern Cobra Squadron.

Israeli Air Force squadrons